Usov is a Russian male surname, its feminine counterpart is Usova. It may refer to
 Aleksandr Usov (athlete) (born 1976), Russian sprinter
Alexandre Usov (born 1977), Belarusian racing cyclist
Anton Usov (born 1994), Russian association football player
Fyodor Usov (born 1982), Russian association football player
Ivan Usov (born 1977), Russian swimmer 
Mikhail Usov (1883–1939), Russian geologist
Roman Usov (born 1978), Russian Olympic runner
Sergey Usov (born 1964), Olympic runner from Uzbekistan
Anastasiya Usova (born 1988), Kazakhstani singer 
Maya Usova (born 1964), Russian ice dancer
Tatiana Usova (born 1987), Russian fashion model
Kostiantyn Usov (born 1988), Ukrainian MP

See also
 Úsov, a town in Czech Republic